Nyx in Greek mythology was the primordial goddess of the night.

Nyx or NYX may refer to:

Astronomy
 3908 Nyx, an Amor and Mars-crosser asteroid

Fictional characters

Film and television
 Nyx (Once Upon a Time in Wonderland), the guardian of the well in the U.S. TV series
 Nyx, a character in Dark Matter (TV series)
 Nyx, a scout fairy in the film Tinker Bell and the Legend of the Neverbeast
 Nyx Ulric, the protagonist in the film Kingsglaive: Final Fantasy XV
 Nyx, a character in the videogame Quake Champions
 Nyx, a character in the videogame Dota 2

Other media
 NYX (comics), an American comic book miniseries by Marvel Comics
 Nyx (Image Comics), a character of the Spawn comic book series.
 Nyx (Marvel Comics), the supervillain of the Avengers: No Road Home comic book series.
 Nyx, a character in the Queen's Blade book series
 Nyx, a character in the video game Persona 3

Music
 Nyx (composition), an orchestral composition by Esa-Pekka Salonen
Nyx, by Mary Finsterer

Other uses
 Nyx (moth), a moth genus
 Nyx (prototype), an experimental prototype for the Amiga computer platform's AAA chipset
 NyxQuest: Kindred Spirits, A 2D-3D hybrid video game for WiiWare by Over the Top Studios
 NYX (gene), a gene encoding the protein Nyctalopin
 NYX, stock symbol for NYSE Euronext (formerly NYSE Group, Inc.), operator of multiple securities exchanges
 NYX Cosmetics, an American cosmetics company owned by L'Oréal

See also 
 Nix (disambiguation)